Blood Brothers 2 is an anthology of short adventures published by Chaosium in 1992 for the Lovecraftian horror role-playing game Call of Cthulhu.

Contents
Blood Brothers 2 is a sequel to the anthology Blood Brothers published by Chaosium in 1990. Like the first book, Blood Brothers 2 is an anthology of nine short adventures that are based on themes, monsters and plots taken from classic B movies. The adventures include references to Gidget, High Plains Drifter,  and Mexican lucha libre wrestlers.

Reception
In the November 1992 edition of Dragon (Issue 187), Allen Varney enjoyed the generous serving of B-movie humor, saying, "Cue the theremin!"

Reviews
White Wolf #35 (March/April, 1993)

References

Call of Cthulhu (role-playing game) adventures
Role-playing game supplements introduced in 1992